Rhyzodiastes mirabilis is a species of ground beetle in the subfamily Rhysodinae. It was described by Arthur Mills Lea in 1904. It is found in Queensland (Australia).

References

Rhyzodiastes
Beetles of Australia
Endemic fauna of Australia
Insects of Queensland
Beetles described in 1904
Taxa named by Arthur Mills Lea